The 2018 CAF Champions League (officially the 2018 Total CAF Champions League for sponsorship reasons) was the 54th edition of Africa's premier club football tournament organized by the Confederation of African Football (CAF), and the 22nd edition under the current CAF Champions League title.

Espérance de Tunis won the title for the third time, defeating Al Ahly in the final, and qualified as the CAF representative at the 2018 FIFA Club World Cup in the United Arab Emirates, and also earned the right to play against the winners of the 2018 CAF Confederation Cup, Raja Casablanca, in the 2019 CAF Super Cup.

Wydad AC were the defending champions, but were eliminated in the quarter-finals by ES Sétif.

Association team allocation
All 56 CAF member associations may enter the CAF Champions League, with the 12 highest ranked associations according to their CAF 5-Year Ranking eligible to enter two teams in the competition. As a result, theoretically a maximum of 68 teams could enter the tournament – although this level has never been reached.

For the 2018 CAF Champions League, the CAF uses the 2012–2016 CAF 5-Year Ranking, which calculates points for each entrant association based on their clubs’ performance over those 5 years in the CAF Champions League and CAF Confederation Cup. The criteria for points are the following:

The points are multiplied by a coefficient according to the year as follows:
2016 – 5
2015 – 4
2014 – 3
2013 – 2
2012 – 1

Teams
The following 59 teams from 47 associations entered the competition:
Teams in bold received a bye to the first round.
The other teams entered the preliminary round.

This was the second highest number of teams in the history of CAF Champions League. The highest number was recorded in 2007 where 60 teams entered.

Associations are shown according to their 2012–2016 CAF 5-Year Ranking – those with a ranking score have their rank and score indicated.

Notes

Associations which did not enter a team

 Cape Verde
 Chad
 Djibouti
 Eritrea
 Namibia
 Réunion
 São Tomé and Príncipe
 Sierra Leone
 Somalia

Schedule
The schedule of the competition was as follows (matches scheduled in midweek in italics). The regulations were modified with an additional draw before the quarter-finals. Effective from the Champions League group stage, weekend matches were played on Fridays and Saturdays while midweek matches were played on Tuesdays, with some exceptions. Kick-off times were also fixed at 13:00 (Saturdays and Tuesdays only), 16:00 and 19:00 GMT.

Qualifying rounds

Preliminary round

First round

Group stage

In the group stage, each group was played on a home-and-away round-robin basis. The winners and runners-up of each group advanced to the quarter-finals of the knockout stage.

Group A

Group B

Group C

Group D

Knockout stage

Bracket

Quarter-finals

Semi-finals

Final

Top goalscorers

Prize money
In 2018, the fixed amount of prize money paid to the clubs is as follows:

Note: National associations receive an additional equivalent share of 5% for each amount awarded to clubs.

See also
2018 CAF Confederation Cup
2018 FIFA Club World Cup
2019 CAF Super Cup

References

External links
22nd Edition Of Total CAF Champions League, CAFonline.com

2018
 
1